John Benibengor Blay (born 1915) was a Ghanaian journalist, writer, publisher and politician, who has been called "the father of popular writing in Ghana". His work encompasses fiction, poetry and drama published in chapbooks that have been compared with Onitsha Market Literature.

Life and career
Blay was born in Half Assini, Western Ghana, and educated at the Regent Street Polytechnic in London.

He began writing poetry in 1937, publishing stories from the early 1940s onwards. Some of his work was published by his own publishing company, the Benibengor Book Agency, Aboso.

He later became a politician, and in 1958 Blay was elected to the Ghanaian National Assembly. He later served as Minister for Art and Culture (1965–66) under Kwame Nkrumah, about whom he published a biography in 1973.

Works
Stories
Emelia's Promise, 1944
Be Content with Your Lot, 1947
Parted Lovers, 1948
Dr Bengto Wants a Wife', 1953Operation Witchcraft, 1956Tales for Boys and Girls, 1966After the Wedding (continuation of Emelia's Promise)Emelia's Promise and Fulfilment, Accra: Waterville Publishing House, 1967Alomo, Aboso, 1969Coconut Boy, Accra: West African Publishing Company, 1970

PoetryImmortal Deeds, Ilfracombe: Stockwell, 1940. Memoirs of the War, Ilfracombe: Stockwell, 1946King of the Human Frame, Ilfracombe: Stockwell, 1947Thoughts of Youth, Aboso: Benibengor Book Agency, 1961Ghana Sings, Accra: Waterville Publishing House, 1965. With an introduction by Kwame Nkrumah.

OtherThe Gold Coast Mines Employees' Union, Ilfracombe: Stockwell, 1950On The Air: (B.B.C. Talks), Aboso, 1970Legend of Kwame Nkrumah, 1973The Story of Tata'', c. 1976

References

External links
Brief biography of J. Benibengor Blay

1915 births
Possibly living people
Ghanaian novelists
Ghanaian male poets
Ghanaian journalists
Ghanaian publishers (people)
Ghanaian MPs 1956–1965
20th-century Ghanaian poets
20th-century male writers
20th-century journalists